Nathan Sologinkin (born 1 June 1978) is a former rugby league footballer of the 1990s and 2000s. He played for the South Queensland Crushers in 1997, the Canberra Raiders from 1998 to 1999, the Canterbury-Bankstown Bulldogs in 2000 and 2002 and finally the Melbourne Storm in 2003.

In December 2020, Sologinkin lost his appeal against a conviction for indecent assault dating from July 2017.

References

External links
Rugby League Project - Nathan Sologinkin
Nathan Sologinkin - Bulldogs History Database

1978 births
Living people
Australian people convicted of indecent assault
Australian rugby league players
Canberra Raiders players
Canterbury-Bankstown Bulldogs players
Melbourne Storm players
Rugby league players from Mackay, Queensland
Rugby league second-rows
South Queensland Crushers players